Daughters of the Polo God is a 2018 Indian Meitei-English bilingual documentary film directed by Roopa Baruah and edited by Hemanti Sarkar.  It is based on the story of girls and horses empowering each other. It is about saving the endangered Meitei horse (Manipuri pony) and empowering women in the sport of polo simultaneously.

The film is about Meitei women moving forward in the male-dominated sportive society of polo sports. It also shows the development of their special relationship with their Meitei horses (Manipuri ponies). They are always trying at their best levels to be able to participate in the annual polo tournament.

The film starts with Sagol Kangjei, the ancient form of form of polo as a wartime peace exercise in Antique Kangleipak (Ancient Manipur). It was a war game.  That means the sport was placed during peacetime so warriors could practice their war skills. It ended up with the present day advancements of the Manipur Horse Riding and Polo Association. It creates a cultural, ecological, historical and social relationship between the sport, the horses, and the ethnic groups of humans who live in that part of the world.

Background 
The polo started in the far corner of the North East India (Ancient Manipur). It has been developed there for many centuries. At the same time, Women's empowerment has been very active in the history of Manipur. Roopa Barua, the maker of the "Daughters of the Polo God", took interest in these facts. So, she set her project on it. She said, 
"A young polo sisterhood is developing in Manipur that ploughs on in spite of adversity and political turmoil. They are intensely connected to their sacred Manipuri pony and play an international tournament every year. My film is a tribute to these polo players, the modern Manipuri women and the pony campaign."
She spoke to the media that Meitei girls are empowered a lot and have been able to play and do well for themselves. Before the beginning of the journey, the polo girls offered prayers to Marjing, the "Polo God" of Meitei religion (Sanamahism), at his pantheon. And so, the name of the film is also taken from the sense that the polo player girls are the daughters of their beloved father like Polo God of their own ethnic religion. Notably, it took over four years to complete the making of the movie.

Reception 
The Equus Festival takes its winning films on a film tour across North American and European countries. The "Daughters of the Polo God" was also one of the winners. So, it was also shown in the different places. These are:

Screenings 
The film received official entries in many international film festivals organised across the world. These include:

Accolades 
The film received 6 international awards at 5 International Film Festivals held at different countries of the world.

See also 
 Imphal 1944
 Japan Landa Imphal
 Manipuri Pony (film)
 My Japanese Niece

References

External links 
 Daughters of the Polo God IMDb
 Daughters of the Polo God South Asia Institute
 Daughters of the Polo God at NYIFF
 Daughters of the Polo God at New York

Cinema of Manipur
2010s English-language films
English-language Indian films
2018 films
Indian multilingual films
Meitei culture
2010s Meitei-language films
Meitei folklore in popular culture
2018 multilingual films
Northeast Indian films
Women's empowerment
History of women in India